The ICF Canoe Slalom World Rankings are the performance-based rankings of canoe slalom athletes competing in the official International Canoe Federation (ICF) Ranking Series of events. It is used to determine the starting order for qualification at international events, most notably World Cups and World Championships, across all current Olympic disciplines, with athletes starting in the reverse order of their ICF Canoe Slalom Ranking. The rankings are updated quarterly but were frozen from December 2019 to September 2021 due to the ongoing COVID-19 pandemic.

Ranking method
Rankings are determined by an athlete's average score across their 5 best results in the 2 year period directly beforehand. The athlete with the lowest average score will be ranked number 1 in their respective Canoe Slalom (C1M, C1W, K1M, K1W, C2M or C2Mx). An athlete who has competed in less than 5 ICF events will be ranked below all athletes who have completed five or more events, regardless of their average score.

ICF points are calculated for each stage of competition (Heats, Semi finals and Finals), with an athlete's lowest score across the three stages contributing towards their average. The earlier stages are offset by 20 and 10 points respectively so that qualifying first in the heats stage or winning the semi final are not equivalent to winning the final.

Additionally, scores are offset by a "quality factor" added to an athlete's score at a given event in order to accommodate for the varying levels of competition across the ICF Ranking Series of events. World Cups, World Championships and the Olympic Games are prescribed a quality factor of zero, whilst less competitive events may be prescribed a quality factor of over 100. The lowest quality factor outside of the major events is typically the Australian Open, which is prescribed a quality factor of approximately 2 (varying year to year).

Within these rules, an athlete may achieve an average score of 0 if they win five of the 12 races that hold a quality factor of zero across a 2 year period (5 World Cups and a World Championships or Olympic Games each year).

Current rankings
Below are the current ICF Canoe Slalom World Rankings in Olympic disciplines, correct as of the first quarter of 2022. Movement is shown relative to the rankings from the previous quarter. A  denotes the current Olympic champion, the reigning world champion is shown in bold,  and the overall world cup winner is in italics. The rankings were frozen from December 2019 to September 2021 due to the ongoing COVID-19 pandemic.

Year-end No. 1 ranked athletes
Canoe

Kayak

Notes
Following the 2018 Season, C2M events were dropped from the schedule of all major events due to their Olympic status being removed. Despite this, the ICF continued to calculate the C2M world rankings for two more years.
The 2020 ICF World Rankings were frozen due to the ongoing COVID-19 pandemic, with all rankings maintained from the 2019 Season.

References

Canoeing